Kurya is a rural locality (a selo) and the administrative center of Kuryinsky District of Altai Krai, Russia.  Population: 

It is the place of birth of Mikhail Kalashnikov. In November 2013 a museum dedicated to him was opened in the town, in a century-old wooden school house where Kalashnikov used to study. Kalashnikov, who turned 94 years old at the time of the opening, said he was unable to attend the opening ceremony due to poor health (he died only the following month). Kalashnikov had donated numerous personal items to the museum, including an honorary professor's robe from Harvard University and a letter from late Venezuelan President, Hugo Chavez, who traveled to Russia in 2009 to personally congratulate Kalashnikov on his 90th birthday.

References

Notes

Sources

Rural localities in Kuryinsky District